Leon Labuschagne is a paralympic athlete from South Africa competing mainly in category F53 shot and discus events.

Leon competed in two paralympics, firstly in Barcelona in 1992 where he competed in the shot put and won the THW4 discus.  Four years later he again won the discus, this time in the F53 class and finished fourth in the shot put.

References

Paralympic athletes of South Africa
Athletes (track and field) at the 1992 Summer Paralympics
Athletes (track and field) at the 1996 Summer Paralympics
Paralympic gold medalists for South Africa
Living people
Medalists at the 1992 Summer Paralympics
Medalists at the 1996 Summer Paralympics
Year of birth missing (living people)
Paralympic medalists in athletics (track and field)
South African male discus throwers
20th-century South African people
21st-century South African people
Wheelchair discus throwers
Paralympic discus throwers